Grijpskerk  (abbreviation: Gk) is an unstaffed railway station in Grijpskerk, Netherlands. It is located on the Harlingen–Nieuweschans railway between Buitenpost and Zuidhorn.

The station was opened on 1 June 1866. The train service is operated by Arriva.

Train services

Bus services

References

External links 
 
 Grijpskerk station , station information

1866 establishments in the Netherlands
Railway stations in Groningen (province)
Railway stations on the Staatslijn B
Railway stations opened in 1866
Westerkwartier (municipality)
Railway stations in the Netherlands opened in the 19th century